Elina Born (born 29 June 1994) is an Estonian singer. She represented Estonia in the Eurovision Song Contest 2015 along with Stig Rästa with the song "Goodbye to Yesterday". She previously attempted to represent Estonia in the Eurovision Song Contest in 2013 with the song "Enough", and attempted to represent Estonia at the Eurovision Song Contest in 2017 finishing last in the final. She was the runner-up of the fifth season of Eesti otsib superstaari.

Biography

Early life
Elina Born was born on 29 June 1994 in Lehtse, Estonia. Stig Rästa discovered Elina Born on YouTube, she was singing "Cruz" by Christina Aguilera, he said "I was completely charmed by her musicality". Elina was at school when a message from Stig appeared on her Facebook. On the experience, Born stated "To be honest, I started crying. It took me a couple of days to gather the courage to write back".

Career

2012–13: Eesti otsib superstaari & Eesti Laul

In 2012, Elina Born took part on Estonian reality-competition gameshow Eesti otsib superstaari (Estonia is Searching for a Superstar). The program seeks to discover the best singer in Estonia through a series of nationwide auditions. She made it through the audition, theatre round, studio round and final. She reached the Super Final but finished runner-up to Rasmus Rändvee.

Elina Born participated in Eesti Laul 2013 with her first single, "Enough", written by Stig Rästa and Fred Krieger. She qualified for the final and finished 8th.

2014–Present: Eurovision Song Contest & Eesti Laul

Elina Born took part in Eesti Laul 2015 with Stig Rästa, organised by the Estonian broadcaster Eesti Rahvusringhääling (ERR). They took part in Semi-final 2 of Eesti Laul 2015 with the song "Goodbye to Yesterday" which took place on 14 February 2015. They progressed to the Final, which took place on 21 February 2015, and then to the Superfinal along with two other songs. They were chosen to represent Estonia at the Eurovision Song Contest 2015. Elina and Stig took 7th place in the final with a total of 106 points.

Two years later, in 2017, Elina came back to Eesti Laul with the song "In or Out", written by Stig Rästa, Vallo Kikas and Fred Krieger. She qualified for the final and finished 10th.

Discography

Albums

Singles

As lead artist

As featured artist

References

External links
Elina Born on Facebook

1994 births
Living people
People from Tapa Parish
21st-century Estonian women singers
Estonian pop singers
English-language singers from Estonia
Eurovision Song Contest entrants for Estonia
Eurovision Song Contest entrants of 2015
Idols (franchise) participants
Eesti Laul winners